Born out of the American Independent Comics Movement, Silly Daddy is a comic book, graphic novel and webcomics blog by Joe Chiappetta. Started shortly after the birth of his first child in 1991, artist Joe Chiappetta began his career as "Silly Daddy", a mostly autobiographical comic series centered on his experience (and lack thereof) as a father. Since Joe is a resident of Chicago, most of the Silly Daddy adventures take place in the Chicago area or local dreamland. Major themes in this eclectic series include parenting, family relationships, goofing off, the search for joy and meaning in life, and redemption. The print comic version and the webcomic have elements of humor, surrealism, and slice-of-life observations.

Timeline
Chiappetta began publishing Silly Daddy in 1991. A graphic novel collection of his work came out in 1994, featuring a decade of art. Chiappetta began posting Silly Daddy as a webcomic in 2004, and moved it to Blogger in early 2007.

Chiappetta was most active as a cartoonist in the 1990s, and largely moved on to writing prose in the 2000s.

Reception
Reviewing the 1994 Silly Daddy graphic novel, Publishers Weekly described the collection as reminiscent of Harvey Pekar's American Splendor at first glance, though noted the appeal of seeing Chiapetta's "considerable evolution as an artist" in the book. The art and lettering of early stories in the book are described as "terribly crude", while the book's cover is described as "genuinely handsome".

Awards
 Xeric Award Winner: 1998
 Ignatz Award Nominee: Outstanding Artist, 1998
 Ignatz Award Nominee: Outstanding Story, 1997
 Harvey Award Nominee: Best New Series, 1996
 Illinois Arts Council Award, 2012

References

American comics artists
1968 births
Living people
2004 webcomic debuts